An emergency management information system (EMIS) is a computer database for disaster response that provides graphical, real-time information to responders.

EMIS and emergencies
Four phases of an emergency are Readiness, Risk Mitigation, Response, and Replay. An EMIS shall enable emergency managers or any emergency stakeholder (affected civilians, police, fireman, Non Government Organizations (NGO), etc.)  make their required activities in any phase of an emergency in an easy and speedy way.

EMIS for Readiness
Preparation of contingency plans for different types of emergencies
Creating checklists that can be easily reached by any related emergency management stakeholder 
Resource management

EMIS for Risk Mitigation
Determine possible risk areas and/or risk types. Often supported by a geographical information system (GIS).

EMIS for Response
Executing and tracking the contingency plan

EMIS for Replay
Review the events of the emergency
Various kind of reports (supported by tables, graphs, etc.) 

An EMIS interacts with many other early alert systems and communicates with many legacy systems.

See also 
 Emergency management
 Emergency management software
 Emergency Communication System
 Logistics Support System
 Wireless Emergency Alerts

References

Applications of geographic information systems
Emergency management in the United States
Emergency management software